A deep-sky object (DSO) is any astronomical object that is not an individual star or Solar System object (such as Sun, Moon, planet, comet, etc.). The classification is used for the most part by amateur astronomers to denote visually observed faint naked eye and telescopic objects such as star clusters, nebulae and galaxies.  This distinction is practical and technical, implying a variety of instruments and techniques appropriate to observation, and does not distinguish the nature of the object itself.

Origins and classification
Classifying non-stellar astronomical objects began soon after the invention of the telescope. One of the earliest comprehensive lists was Charles Messier's 1774 Messier catalog, which included 103 "nebulae" and other faint fuzzy objects he considered a nuisance since they could be mistaken for comets, the objects he was actually searching for. As telescopes improved these faint nebulae would be broken into more descriptive scientific classifications such as interstellar clouds, star clusters, and galaxies.

"Deep-sky object", as an astronomical classification for these objects, has its origins in the modern field of amateur astronomy. The origin of the term is unknown but it was popularized by Sky & Telescope magazine's "Deep-Sky Wonders" column, which premiered in their first edition in 1941, created by Leland S. Copeland, written for the majority of its run by Walter Scott Houston, and currently penned by Sue French. Houston's columns, and later book compilations of those columns, helped popularize the term, each month giving the reader a guided tour of a small part of the sky highlighting well known and lesser known objects for binoculars and small telescopes.

Observations and activities

There are many amateur astronomical techniques and activities associated with deep-sky objects. Some of these objects are bright enough to find and see in binoculars and small telescopes. But the faintest objects need the light-gathering power of telescopes with large objectives, and since they are invisible to the naked eye, can be hard to find. This has led to increased popularity of GoTo telescopes that can find DSOs automatically, and large reflecting telescopes, such as Dobsonian style telescopes, with wide fields of view well suited to such observing. Observing faint objects needs dark skies, so these relatively portable types of telescopes also lend themselves to the majority of amateurs who need to travel outside light polluted urban locations. To cut down light pollution and enhance contrast, observers employ "nebular filters" designed to admit certain wavelengths of light, and block others.

There are organized activities associated with DSOs such as the Messier marathon, which occurs at a specific time each year and involves observers trying to spot all 110 Messier objects in one night. Since the Messier catalog objects were discovered with relatively small 18th-century telescopes, it is a popular list with observers, being well within the grasp of most modern amateur telescopes. A much more demanding test known as the Herschel 400 is designed to tax larger telescopes and experienced amateur astronomers.

List of deep-sky object types
There are many astronomical object types that come under the description of deep-sky objects. Since the definition is objects that are non-Solar System and non-stellar the list includes:

Star clusters
Open clusters
Globular clusters
Nebulae
Bright nebulae
Emission nebulae
Reflection nebulae
Dark nebulae
Planetary nebulae
Galaxies

See also
Amateur telescope making
Celestial cartography
Shallow sky
Star catalogue
Star hopping

References

 Neil Bone, Wil Tirion, Deep Sky Observer's Guide. Firefly Books, 2005. .
 Jess K. Gilmour, The practical astronomer's deep-sky companion. Springer, 2003. .
 Jack Newton, Philip Teece. The Guide to Amateur Astronomy. Cambridge University Press, 1995. .
 W. H. Finlay, Concise Catalog of Deep-sky Objects: Astrophysical Information for 500 Galaxies, Clusters and Nebulae. London: Springer, 2003. . Includes the Messier objects, Herschel 400 & more.
 Roger Nelson Clark, Visual astronomy of the deep sky. CUP Archive, 1990. .

Further reading
 Burnham's Celestial Handbook by Robert Burnham, Jr. (Volume One, Volume Two, Volume Three at Google Books)
 Deep Sky Observer's Guide by Neil Bone, Wil Tirion. Firefly Books, 2005. .
 The practical astronomer's deep-sky companion by Jess K. Gilmour. Springer, 2003. .
 Concise Catalog of Deep-sky Objects: Astrophysical Information for 500 Galaxies, Clusters and Nebulae by W. H. Finlay. London: Springer, 2003. . Includes the Messier objects, Herschel 400 & more
 Visual astronomy of the deep sky by Roger Nelson Clark. CUP Archive, 1990. .

External links
 Deep Sky Observers Companion: Online deep sky object description database and observing planner
 
 clell.de, Deep Sky collections and catalogs similar to Messier's 
 Sketch gallery of deep sky objects by Wes Stone

Astronomical nomenclature
Observational astronomy
Star clusters
Galaxies
Nebulae